Liversedge Spen railway station served the town of  Liversedge, in the historical county of West Riding of Yorkshire, England, from 1900 to 1953 on the Leeds New Line.

History 
The station was opened as Liversedge on 1 October 1900 by the London and North Western Railway. It was briefly known as Liversedge Littletown. The goods yard, which opened on 1 November 1900, consisted of seven sidings and had stables and warehouses. Stanley Colliery was also nearby. 'Spen' was added to the station's name on 2 June 1924. It closed on 5 October 1953.

References

External links 

Disused railway stations in West Yorkshire
Former London and North Western Railway stations
Railway stations in Great Britain opened in 1900
Railway stations in Great Britain closed in 1953
1900 establishments in England
1953 disestablishments in England